Šárka Ullrichová (born 10 December 1974) is a Czech actress best known for her role as Zuzana Hrubá in Ulice. She was born on December 10, 1974, in the town of Turnov  in Czechoslovakia. Having graduated from the DAMU, she received a job at the Šalda theatre in Liberec. Šárka Ullrichová has performed numerous television shows and movies, including appearances in Pleasant Moments.

References

External links 
  Šárka Ulrichová: Biography // Super.cz
 

1974 births
Living people
Academy of Performing Arts in Prague alumni
Czech television actresses
Czech film actresses
People from Turnov
20th-century Czech actresses
21st-century Czech actresses